Two ships of the Royal Navy have been named HMS Truculent.

  was a Yarrow Later M-class destroyer that saw service in World War I.
  was a T-class submarine that saw service in World War II.

Royal Navy ship names